Alencar is a given name and surname. Notable people with the surname include:

Alencar Santana (born 1976), Brazilian politician
Humberto de Alencar Castelo Branco (1900–1967), Brazilian statesman
José Alencar (born 1931–2011), Brazilian politician
José de Alencar (1829–1877), Brazilian novelist
Otto Alencar (born 1947), Brazilian politician
Tiago Alencar dos Santos, (born 1986) Brazilian footballer
Alencar (footballer, born 2002) (Rodrigo Souza Santos) Brazilian footballer
Manoel Alencar do Monte (born 1892), Brazilian footballer

Portuguese-language surnames
Portuguese masculine given names